Nebulosa aliena is a moth of the family Notodontidae. It is found in the eastern Andes of Bolivia and Peru.

References

Moths described in 1904
Notodontidae of South America